Prince Wilhelm Friedrich Franz Joseph Christian Olaf of Prussia (4 July 1906 – 26 May 1940) was the eldest child of Wilhelm, German Crown Prince, and Duchess Cecilie of Mecklenburg-Schwerin. At his birth, he was second in line to the German throne and was expected to succeed to the throne after the deaths of his grandfather, Emperor Wilhelm II, and his father, Crown Prince Wilhelm. Both, however, outlived him.

Early life and childhood

Wilhelm was born on 4 July 1906 at the Hohenzollern family's private summer residence, Marmorpalais, or Marble Palace, near Potsdam, where his parents were residing until their own home, Schloss Cecilienhof, could be completed. His father was Crown Prince Wilhelm, the eldest son and heir to the German Emperor, Wilhelm II. His mother was Duchess Cecilie of Mecklenburg-Schwerin. Emperor Franz Joseph of Austria was one of the Prince's godfathers.

The selection of a nanny for Wilhelm and his younger brother, Louis Ferdinand (born in 1907) caused considerable distress within the family.

On his tenth birthday in 1916, Wilhelm was made a lieutenant in the 1st Guards Regiment, and was given the Order of the Black Eagle by his grandfather. Two years later, when he was only twelve, the German monarchy was abolished. Wilhelm and his family remained in Germany, though his grandfather, the former Emperor, went into exile in the Netherlands. The former Crown Prince and his family remained in Potsdam, where Wilhelm and his younger brothers attended the local gymnasium.

After graduating from secondary school, Wilhelm went on to study at the Universities of Königsberg, Munich and Bonn. In 1926, while a student at the University of Bonn, Wilhelm joined the Borussia Corps, a student organization of which his father, grandfather, and other members of the Prussian Royal Family were members.

Marriage and children
While a student at Bonn, Wilhelm fell in love with a fellow student, Dorothea von Salviati (10 September 1907 – 7 May 1972). Her parents were Alexander Hermann Heinrich August von Salviati and Helene "Ella" Crasemann (of the well-established Hamburg merchant family, Crasemann). Her maternal grandfather was the Hamburg parliamentarian Gustav August Rudolph Crasemann.

Wilhelm's grandfather did not approve of the marriage of a member of the minor nobility with the second in line to the German throne. At the time, the former Kaiser still believed in the possibility of a Hohenzollern restoration, and he would not permit his grandson to make an unequal marriage. Wilhelm told his grandson, "Remember, there is every possible form of horse. We are thoroughbreds, however, and when we conclude a marriage such as with Fräulein von Salviati, it produces mongrels, and that cannot be allowed to happen."

However, Wilhelm was determined to marry Dorothea. He renounced any rights to the succession for himself and his future children in 1933. Wilhelm and Dorothea married on 3 June 1933 in Bonn. They had two daughters. In 1940, the ex-Emperor recognized the marriage as dynastic and the girls were accorded the style of Princesses of Prussia, although their father was not restored to his former place in the putative line of succession,
 Princess Felicitas Cecilie Alexandrine Helene Dorothea of Prussia, (7 June 1934 – 1 August 2009), married Dinnies von der Osten (1929–1998) on 12 September 1958 and they were divorced in 1972, with issue. She married secondly Jörg von Nostitz-Wallwitz (b. 1937), with issue.
 Princess Christa Friederike Alexandrine Viktoria of Prussia, (31 October 1936) she married Peter von Assis Liebes (1926–1967), son of Martin Liebes and Countess Clementine von Montgelas on 24 March 1960, without issue.

Military services
During the Weimar Republic, Wilhelm inadvertently caused a public scandal by attending Army manoeuvres in the uniform of the old Imperial First Foot Guards without first seeking government approval. The commander of the Reichswehr, Hans von Seeckt, was forced to resign as a result. The Oster conspiracy of 1938 sought to restore Wilhelm to the throne.

At the beginning of World War II, Wilhelm was among a number of princes from the former German monarchies who enlisted to serve in the Wehrmacht, the unified armed forces of Germany.

Death and reaction

In May 1940, Wilhelm took part in the invasion of France. He was wounded during the fighting in Valenciennes and died in a field hospital in Nivelles on 26 May 1940. His funeral service was held at the Church of Peace, and he was buried in the Hohenzollern family mausoleum in the Antique Temple in Sanssouci Park. The service drew over 50,000 mourners, by far the largest unofficial public turnout during Nazi rule in Germany.

Shortly after Wilhelm's death, a decree known as the Prinzenerlaß, or Prince's Decree, was issued, barring all members of the former German royal houses from service in the Wehrmacht.

Ancestry

References

1906 births
1940 deaths
Prussian princes
German royalty
House of Hohenzollern
People from Potsdam
People from the Province of Brandenburg
University of Königsberg alumni
Ludwig Maximilian University of Munich alumni
University of Bonn alumni
Gebirgsjäger of World War II
German Army personnel killed in World War II
Prussian Army personnel